Subcancilla joapyra is a species of sea snail, a marine gastropod mollusk, in the family Mitridae, the miters or miter snails.

Description
The length of the shell attains 23.3 mm.

Distribution
This species occurs in the Atlantic Ocean off Southeast Brazil.

References

joapyra
Gastropods described in 2012